Glenwood South is a major downtown district in Raleigh, North Carolina, U.S. Glenwood South is among the largest entertainment centers in Raleigh with a multitude of restaurants, clubs, and cafes. The district also has a retail and gallery presence.

History 
Glenwood Avenue was one of the first major thoroughfares which would lead to suburban expansion in the 1950s. It was a minor nightlife hub in the city prior to the 2000s, but truly became the city's entertainment center throughout the 2000s.

References 

Neighborhoods in Raleigh, North Carolina
Streets in North Carolina
Shopping malls in Raleigh, North Carolina
Transportation in Raleigh, North Carolina
U.S. Route 70